The term  has at least two different meanings, and has been used in several contexts.

People
 – a clan of kuge (court nobles) prominent in the Nara and Heian periods (710–1185)
 – a clan of daimyō (feudal lords) prominent in the Muromachi, Sengoku and Edo periods (1333–1868)
Tachibana (surname)

Other
Tachibana-class destroyer, a class Japanese warships during World War II
, two destroyers of the Imperial Japanese Navy
Tachibana, Fukuoka, a former town in Fukuoka Prefecture
Tachibana Station, a railway station in Hyogo Prefecture
Tachibana castle, a castle which formerly stood atop Tachibana Mountain
Tachibana orange, a wild citrus fruit native to Japan